Catherine de Vendôme (1354 – 1 April 1412) was a ruling countess of Vendôme and of Castres from 1372 until 1403.

Life
She was the daughter of John VI of Vendôme and Jeanne of Ponthieu. She married John I, Count of La Marche, in 1364.

In 1372 inherited Vendôme on the death of her niece Jeanne and administered it jointly with her husband, then (after his death) with her second son Louis until 1403.

Issue
James II, Count of La Marche and Castres (1370–1438)
Isabelle (born 1373), a nun at Poissy
Louis, Count of Vendôme (1376–1446)
John, Lord of Carency (1378–1457), married c. 1416 Catherine, daughter of Philip of Artois, Count of Eu, without issue, married in 1420 at Le Mans, his mistress Jeanne de Vendômois, with whom he had issue
Anne (c. 1380 – September 1408, Paris), married in 1401 John of Berry, Count of Montpensier (d. 1401), married in Paris in 1402 Louis VII, Duke of Bavaria
Marie (1386 – aft. 11 September 1463), Lady of Brehencourt, married Jean de Baynes, Lord of Croix
Charlotte (1388 – 15 January 1422), married in 1411 at Nicosia King Janus of Cyprus

Ancestry

References

Sources

1354 births
1412 deaths
Counts of Vendôme
French suo jure nobility
Counts of Castres
14th-century women rulers
15th-century women rulers
14th-century French people
14th-century French women
15th-century French people
15th-century French women